= Hot Rodders of Tomorrow =

Hot Rodders of Tomorrow is an American national competition where high school students tear-down and rebuild an engine in the shortest time possible. The competition is run by a non-profit organization.

The organization has awarded over US$15.5 million in scholarships, including $4.55 million in 2015.
